University of Wales was a university constituency electing one member to the House of Commons of the Parliament of the United Kingdom, from 1918 to 1950. It returned one Member of Parliament (MP), elected under the first-past-the-post voting system.

Boundaries
This university constituency was created by the Representation of the People Act 1918. It was abolished in 1950 by the Representation of the People Act 1948.

The constituency was not a physical area. Its electorate consisted of the graduates of the University of Wales.

Unlike many other university constituencies, University of Wales never elected a Conservative MP, instead regularly electing Liberal MPs.

The constituency returned one Member of Parliament.

Members of Parliament

Elections
The elections in this constituency took place using the first past the post electoral system. In university seats, in this period, the polls were open for five days and voting did not take place on the polling day for the territorial constituencies.

Elections of the 1910s

Elections of the 1920s
 After the fall of the coalition government in 1922, the former Coalition Liberals contested elections as the National Liberal Party.

 Seat vacant at the dissolution of Parliament, following the death of Lewis on 18 July 1923

Elections of the 1930s

Elections of the 1940s
General Election 1939–40:
Another General Election was required to take place before the end of 1940. The political parties had been making preparations for an election to take place from 1939 and by the end of this year, the following candidates had been selected; 
Liberal: Ernest Evans

See also
 1943 University of Wales by-election

References

Sources 
British Parliamentary Election Results 1918–1949, by F.W.S. Craig (Macmillan 1977)
Who's Who of British members of parliament, Vol. III 1918–1945, edited by M. Stenton and S. Lees (The Harvester Press 1979)

Historic parliamentary constituencies in Wales
University constituencies of the Parliament of the United Kingdom
University of Wales
Constituencies of the Parliament of the United Kingdom established in 1918
Constituencies of the Parliament of the United Kingdom disestablished in 1950